This was the first edition of the tournament.

Yulia Putintseva won the title defeating Elina Svitolina in the final 6–2, 6–4.

Seeds

Draw

Finals

Top half

Bottom half

References
 Main Draw
 Qualifying Draw

Siberia Cup - Singles
2011 Singles
Siberia